Capt. Thomas Moore may refer to:
 Captain Tom Moore (1920–2021), British Army officer and fundraiser
 Capt. Thomas Moore House, a historic home in Pennsylvania

See also 
 Thomas Moore (disambiguation)